Alfred Cowles Jr. (5 January 1865, Chicago – 15 January 1939, Chicago) was an American lawyer. He was the son of Alfred Cowles Sr. and Sarah Hutchinson Cowles.  His father was an incorporator along with John S. Scripps of the Chicago Tribune. Alfred Junior graduated from Yale University in 1886, where he was a member of Skull and Bones. He engaged in post-graduate work, at Yale Law School from 1887 to 1888, and Northwestern University from 1888 to 1889. The following year he married Elizabeth Cheney of the Manchester, Connecticut, Cheney family, with whom he had four children: Alfred Cowles III (1891–1984), Knight Cheney Cowles (b. 1892), John Cheney Cowles (b. 1894) and Thomas Hooker Cowles (b. 1895).

Following admission to the bar, Cowles spent most of his life practicing law in Chicago. From 1898 to 1901, he was engaged in the management of the Chicago Tribune, of which he was a director. He was also a director of the American Radiator Company.

References

1865 births
1939 deaths
American lawyers
Cowles family
Yale Law School alumni